John St John, 11th Baron St John of Bletso (died 24 June 1757) was an English peer.

The son of Andrew St John and his wife Jane Blois, daughter of William Blois of Cockfield Hall, Suffolk, he was a nephew of Paulet St John, 8th Baron St John of Bletso and succeeded his brother Rowland St John, 10th Baron St John of Bletso to the family title in 1722.

Lord St John married Elizabeth Crowley (the daughter of Ambrose Crowley) at Greenwich on 6 March 1725.  Their children included:

John St John, 12th Baron St John of Bletso
 St Andrew St John, Dean of Worcester
Henry St John, a Royal Navy captain
Anne, married in 1761 Cotton Trefusis, mother of Robert Trefusis, 17th Baron Clinton
Barbara, who in 1764 became the second wife of George Coventry, 6th Earl of Coventry.
Jane, who married Humphrey Hall.

British comedian and actor Alexander Armstrong is a direct descendant of Lord St John.

References

1757 deaths
John
Year of birth unknown
Barons St John of Bletso